Oluwasimisola "Simisola" Shittu (born 7 November 1999) is a British-born Canadian professional basketball player for the Iowa Wolves of the NBA G League. He played college basketball for the Vanderbilt Commodores. He was one of the top-ranked players in the high school class of 2018.

Early life
Shittu was born in Harrow, London, to a family of Nigerian and Caribbean heritage. He moved to Canada when he was five years old. Shittu then moved to the United States before his freshman year to play higher competition.

High school career

Recruiting

College career
Shittu had an underwhelming freshman year. After Darius Garland tore his meniscus during a game against Kent State, the team went 5–23 including a 0–18 in conference play. His draft value dropped dramatically over the season. Shittu averaged 10.9 points, 6.7 rebounds, and 1.8 assists per game during his freshman season. Following the season, he declared for the 2019 NBA draft.

Professional career

Windy City Bulls (2019–2020)
After going undrafted in the 2019 NBA draft, Shittu joined the Memphis Grizzlies for the 2019 NBA Summer League. On 4 October 2019, Shittu signed with the Chicago Bulls. He was waived in training camp, but assigned to the Bulls’ NBA G League affiliate, the Windy City Bulls. In the final home game of the season, Shittu had 32 points and 21 rebounds in a loss to the Canton Charge.

On 6 December 2020, the Chicago Bulls re-signed Shittu on a non-guaranteed deal. On 18 December 2020, Shittu had a career high 13 points and 6 rebounds in a win against the Oklahoma City Thunder. He was waived at the end of training camp.

Westchester Knicks (2021)
On 21 January 2021, Shittu was included in the roster of the Westchester Knicks. He averaged 14.4 points, 10.1 rebounds and 1.4 assists per game.

Ironi Ness Ziona (2021–2022)
On 24 November 2021, he signed with Ironi Ness Ziona of the Israeli Basketball Super League.

Lakeland Magic (2022–2023)
On 9 August 2022, Shittu was signed by the Orlando Magic. He was waived prior to the start of the 2022–23 season. On November 3, 2022, Shittu was named to the opening night roster for the Lakeland Magic.

Iowa Wolves (2023–present)
On 12 February 2023, Shittu was traded to the Iowa Wolves.

Career statistics

College

|-
| style="text-align:left;"| 2018–19
| style="text-align:left;"| Vanderbilt
| 32 || 31 || 26.7 || .468 || .056 || .576 || 6.7 || 1.8 || .7 || .5 || 10.9

References

External links
Vanderbilt Commodores bio

1999 births
Living people
Basketball people from Ontario
Basketball players from Greater London
Black Canadian basketball players
Canadian expatriate basketball people in the United States
Canadian men's basketball players
English emigrants to Canada
Lakeland Magic players
McDonald's High School All-Americans
People from Harrow, London
Power forwards (basketball)
Sportspeople from Burlington, Ontario
Vanderbilt Commodores men's basketball players
Vermont Academy alumni
Westchester Knicks players
Windy City Bulls players